Harry Gill (1881 – 1968) was a British gymnast. He competed in the men's team event at the 1908 Summer Olympics.

Gill was a member of the Powell's Tillery Gymnastics Club of Abertillery, formed in 1903, and is recorded as a member of the team in 1904, in which year he was a member of the team that competed in the club's first competition, against a team from Newport. He captained the Powell's Tillery team that won the Welsh Amateur Gymnastics Shield in 1906 and the team that were runners-up in 1907. He subsequently became an instructor.

References

External links
 

1881 births
1968 deaths
British male artistic gymnasts
Olympic gymnasts of Great Britain
Gymnasts at the 1908 Summer Olympics
People from Leominster
20th-century British people